The 2001 Women's World Open Squash Championship was the women's edition of the 2001 World Open, which serves as the individual world championship for squash players. The event took place in Melbourne in Australia from 11 October until 19 October 2001. Sarah Fitzgerald won her fourth World Open title, defeating Leilani Joyce in the final.

Seeds

First qualifying round (12 Oct)

Final Qualifying round (13 Oct)

Main draw

Notes
Defending champion Carol Owens represented New Zealand after switching nationality from Australia.

See also
World Open

References

External links
 

2001 in squash
World Squash Championships
Squash tournaments in Australia
2001 in Australian sport
2001 in women's squash
International sports competitions hosted by Australia